Akure South is a Local Government Area in Ondo State, Nigeria. Its headquarters are in the town of Akure.

It has an area of 331 km and a population of 353,211 at the 2006 census.
   
The postal code of the area is 340.

References

Local Government Areas in Ondo State